Karl Weidmann (born 4 July 1931) is a Swiss rower who competed in the 1952 Summer Olympics.

In 1952 he was a crew member of the Swiss boat that won the silver medal in the coxed four event.

References

1931 births
Living people
Swiss male rowers
Olympic rowers of Switzerland
Rowers at the 1952 Summer Olympics
Olympic silver medalists for Switzerland
Olympic medalists in rowing
Medalists at the 1952 Summer Olympics
European Rowing Championships medalists